Baron Rowallan, of Rowallan in the County of Ayr, is a title in the Peerage of the United Kingdom. It was created in 1911 for the Liberal politician Archibald Corbett. He had previously represented Glasgow Tradeston in the House of Commons. His son, the second Baron, fought in both World Wars, was Chief Scout and served as Governor of Tasmania.  the title is held by the latter's grandson, the fourth Baron, who succeeded his father in 1993.

The family seat now is Meikle Mosside Farm, near Fenwick, Ayrshire. The former was Rowallan Castle, near Kilmarnock, East Ayrshire.

Barons Rowallan (1911)
Archibald Cameron Corbett, 1st Baron Rowallan (1856–1933)
Thomas Godfrey Polson Corbett, 2nd Baron Rowallan (1895–1977)
Arthur Cameron Corbett, 3rd Baron Rowallan (1919–1993)
John Polson Cameron Corbett, 4th Baron Rowallan (b. 1947)

The heir apparent is the present holder's son the Hon. Jason William Polson Cameron Corbett (b. 1972)

The heir apparent's heir apparent is his son Alexander William Cameron Corbett (b. 2004)

Arms

References

Kidd, Charles, Williamson, David (editors). Debrett's Peerage and Baronetage (1990 edition). New York: St Martin's Press, 1990.

Baronies in the Peerage of the United Kingdom
Noble titles created in 1911
Noble titles created for UK MPs